Austin International School (AIS) is a 501(c)(3) non-profit private school located in northern Austin, Texas, United States, for students in pre-kindergarten (petite section) through 8th grade (4e).  AIS's primary school program follows a seamless curriculum model of trilingual education, with students studying all subjects seamlessly in French, English, and Spanish. Its secondary school program follows two tracks, preparing students to pursue the IB Diploma, the French Baccalaureate diploma, and/or an accredited American high school diploma once they reach high school.

History 
Austin International School, originally called the "Lycée Français d'Austin" (French School of Austin), was founded in April 2001 by the Consul General of France to Houston, the Honorary Consul of France in Austin, some Austin‐based business leaders, and a group of French, American, and Francophone parents to meet the demands of a growing international and globally‐minded population in Austin.

AIS became the third French‐American school established in Texas and the 43rd in the United States. In its first year, AIS enrolled 65 pre-kindergarten, kindergarten and elementary students, with a student body that included French, American, and other nationalities. In 2006, it received its first American accreditation and in 2007, it became the first and only school in central Texas to be accredited by the French Ministry of Education. In 2019, received additional regional accreditation, becoming one of three schools in the State of Texas to hold full accreditation from both a regional accrediting body and the French Ministry of Education.

In 2019, AIS was awarded a Platinum Seal of Transparency by GuideStar.

Affiliations and accreditation 
Austin International School's is the only school in central Texas to be fully accredited by the Agency for French Education Abroad (the overseas arm of the Ministry of National Education of France) and it is a partner organization of the Mission Laïque Française (MLF). Regionally, the school is fully accredited by the Independent Schools Association of the Southwest (ISAS).</ref>

Through its accreditation, Austin International School is a member of the National Association of Independent Schools (NAIS), the Texas Private Schools Association (TPSA), and is fully recognized by the Texas Private School Accreditation Commission (TEPSAC).

References

External links 
 Austin International School official site

Private K–8 schools in Texas
French international schools in the United States
International schools in Texas
French-American culture in Texas
Educational institutions established in 2001
Bilingual schools in Texas
2001 establishments in Texas